Benito Alazraki (27 October 1921 – 6 June 2007) was a Mexican film director and screenwriter. He directed 40 films between 1955 and 1995. He was the father of advertising executive Carlos Alazraki and grandfather of director Gary Alazraki.

Selected filmography
 Roots (1955)
 Where Are Our Children Going? (1958)
 Dangers of Youth (1960)
 Invincible Guns (1960)
 Rebel Without a House (1960)
 Muñecos infernales (1961)
 Santo Contra los Zombis (1961)
 Espiritismo (1961, released as Spiritism in the US), an adaptation of "The Monkey's Paw".

References

External links

1921 births
2007 deaths
Film directors from Mexico City
Mexican male screenwriters
20th-century screenwriters